The Cosmopolitan may refer to:
Cosmopolitan (magazine), the original name of the magazine in the 1880s was The Cosmopolitan.
Cosmopolitan of Las Vegas, a hotel/casino/condo in Las Vegas, Nevada that opened in December 2010
Cosmopolitan on the Park, or simply "the Cosmopolitan", a skyscraper in Portland, Oregon, United States

See also
Cosmopolitan (disambiguation)
The Cosmopolitans, American new wave band (1975–1982)